Kevin Iodice (born 12 January 2001) is a Swiss footballer who plays as a defender for FC Vaduz in the Swiss Challenge League

Career

Grasshopper Club Zürich
Iodice was part of the Grasshopper Club Zürich youth system, playing for their U16, U18 and U19 youth squads during his tenure with the club from 2017-2021.  During this time he played for Grasshoppers II in the lower Swiss leagues.

Iodice made his senior debut for Grasshopper Club Zürich on 30 July 2020 in a Swiss Super League game against FC Aarau.

FC Vaduz
On 28 January, 2021 Iodice was transferred to FC Vaduz.  His contract was signed to run until Summer 2023. During the 2021/2022 season, he made 17 appearances in the Swiss Challenge League and two appearances in the FL Cup.  Across both competitions, he collected 8 yellow cards.

References

2001 births
Living people
Grasshopper_Club_Zürich_players
FC Vaduz players
Swiss expatriate footballers
Swiss expatriate sportspeople in Liechtenstein
Expatriate footballers in Liechtenstein
Swiss_Super_League_players
Swiss_Challenge_League_players
Swiss men's footballers
People_from_Schlieren,_Switzerland
Association_football_defenders